Alfredo Gomes (16 January 1899 – 17 March 1963) was a Brazilian long-distance runner. He competed in the men's 5000 metres at the 1924 Summer Olympics.

References

External links
 

1899 births
1963 deaths
Athletes (track and field) at the 1924 Summer Olympics
Brazilian male long-distance runners
Olympic athletes of Brazil
Olympic cross country runners